Manfred Knickenberg (born 26 August 1937) is a German sprinter. He competed in the men's 100 metres at the 1964 Summer Olympics. He won a bronze medal with the sprint relay at the 1966 Europeans, placing fourth in the 100, and he also finished second in the 100 at the 1965 European Cup.

References

1937 births
Living people
Athletes (track and field) at the 1964 Summer Olympics
German male sprinters
Olympic athletes of the United Team of Germany
Sportspeople from Wuppertal